The prōtokynēgos ("first huntsman") was a Byzantine court office and honorific title in the 13th–15th centuries, who was the chief huntsman of the Byzantine emperors.

History and functions
The office first appears in the 13th-century Empire of Nicaea, although it clearly had earlier antecedents; possibly the komēs tou kynēgiou (κόμης τοῡ κυνηγίου. "Count of the Hunt") attested in an undated seal. In the Book of Offices written by pseudo-Kodinos in the middle of the 14th century, the post occupies the 41st place in the imperial hierarchy, between the megas logariastēs and the skouterios. Rodolphe Guilland suggested that it was closely associated with the prōtoierakarios ("first falconer"), who was in the 48th place, and that holders of the latter office were promoted to the former. Hunting was a particular passion of Byzantine emperors; in the 14th century, Andronikos III Palaiologos is said to have maintained over a thousand hunting dogs and over a thousand falcons.

According to pseudo-Kodinos, his functions were to hold the stirrups for the emperor when he mounted his horse, and to lead the hunters (σκυλλόμαγγοι, skyllomangoi). He enjoyed a peculiar privilege: if during the hunt, one of the emperor's garments became smeared with blood, the prōtokynēgos received it as a gift. His court uniform consisted of a gold-brocaded hat (skiadion), a plain silk kabbadion, and a skaranikon (domed hat) covered in golden and lemon-yellow silk and decorated with gold wire and images of the emperor in front and rear, respectively depicted enthroned and on horseback.

The lowly rank and obscure charge of the position means that its holders are not often attested. However, the title was also given by the emperors as a mark of distinction to officials or military commanders. This gave the holders of the title a place in the court hierarchy, but was not an active charge.

List of known prōtokynegoi

See also

 Medieval hunting
 Grand Huntsman of France

References

Sources

 
 

Byzantine court titles
Greek words and phrases
History of hunting
Lists of office-holders in the Byzantine Empire